Henry Majeski (December 13, 1916 – August 9, 1991) was an American professional baseball player, coach and minor league manager.

Baseball career
In his second season at Eau Claire, he posted a .365 batting average to finish as runnerup in the  Northern League batting championship. His performance brought him to the attention of the Chicago Cubs who signed him to a contract and sent him to play for their Minor League affiliate, the Moline Plowboys of the Three-I League. Majeski continued to perform well, winning the  Three-I League batting championship with a .345 batting average. He was traded to the Birmingham Barons of the Southern Association in  where he hit for a .325 average.

Majeski's contract was purchased by the Boston Braves, then known as the Boston Bees and, he made his major league debut with the team on May 17, 1939 at the age of 22. During his rookie season, Bees' manager Casey Stengel converted him into a third baseman. Majeski began the season hitting above .300 for the first half of the season before a mid-season slump saw his average dip to .238 but, he recovered to finish the year with a .272 average along with 7 home runs and 54 runs batted in.

Majeski only appeared in 19 games for the Bees in 1940, spending most of the season with the minor league Newark Bears, a New York Yankees farm team. Majeski hit for a .323 average during the Bears' season, then hit .478 in the post-season to help the Bears defeat the Louisville Colonels of the American Association in the  Junior World Series. At the beginning of the 1941 season, Stengel decided to replace Majeski with Sibby Sisti as the Bees' third baseman and, in May 1941 his contract was purchased by the New York Yankees. In  while still playing for the Newark Bears, Majeski won the International League batting championship with a .345 batting average and was named the league's Most Valuable Player.

He reported back to the Yankees in 1946 and, after an impressive spring training performance, made the team as a utility player. After appearing in only eight games, his contract was sold to Connie Mack's Philadelphia Athletics in June 1946.

Majeski immediately became the starting third baseman for the Athletics, appearing in 78 games. On July 29, 1947, he escaped serious injury when he was hit in the head by a fastball thrown by Chicago White Sox pitcher, Earl Harrist.

Majeski had his best season in 1948, hitting for a .310 batting average along with 12 home runs, 120 runs batted in, .368 on-base percentage, and a .454 slugging percentage. He led the league once again with a .975 fielding percentage, finished third in assists and in putouts and finished 11th in voting for the  American League Most Valuable Player Award. On August 27, 1948, Majeski set an American League record for most doubles in a doubleheader with 6.

On August 7, Majeski was once again hit in the head by a fastball, this time thrown by Cleveland Indians pitcher Early Wynn. Majeski seemed to fall out of favor with manager Connie Mack and he would be traded to the Chicago White Sox before the 1950 season. He rebounded with the White Sox to post a .309 batting average with 6 home runs and 46 runs batted in. After only a year and a half with the White Sox, he was traded back to the Athletics in June 1951.

A year later, his contract was purchased by the Cleveland Indians where he served as a utility infielder behind Al Rosen, and helped tutor a young Bobby Ávila. Majeski helped the Indians win the  American League Pennant, batting .281 with only 3 errors while backing up Rosen at third base and filling in as a second baseman when Avila was injured. He also hit a pinch hit three-run home run in Game 4 of the 1954 World Series in a losing cause against the New York Giants. He was traded to the Baltimore Orioles in June 1955, and then retired as a player at the end of the season at the age of 38.

Career statistics
In a thirteen-year major league career, Majeski played in 1,069 games, accumulating 956 hits in 3,421 at bats for a .279 career batting average along with 57 home runs and 501 runs batted in. In , Majeski set a then-record .988 fielding percentage, still the fifth highest single-season average for third basemen in major league baseball history. He ended his career with a .968 fielding percentage, the eighteenth highest average for third basemen in major league history.

Managing and coaching career
After retiring as a player, Majeski took on the role of minor league manager in the Cleveland Indians organisation. In , he managed the Daytona Beach Islanders to a fourth-place finish in the Florida State League, and in  he led the Cocoa Indians to a sixth-place finish. Majeski also served as a scout for several teams. He later was the baseball coach for Wagner College and, was a batting coach for the Houston Astros.

Majeski died of cancer on Staten Island, New York on August 9,  at the age of 74.

See also
 Van Lingle Mungo (song)

References

External links

1916 births
1991 deaths
Baltimore Orioles players
Birmingham Barons players
Boston Bees players
Boston Braves players
Chicago White Sox players
Cleveland Indians players
Deaths from cancer in New York (state)
Eau Claire Bears players
Houston Astros scouts
Los Angeles Dodgers scouts
Major League Baseball third basemen
Minor league baseball managers
Moline Plowboys players
Newark Bears (IL) players
New York Yankees players
New York Yankees scouts
Philadelphia Athletics players
Sportspeople from Staten Island
Baseball players from New York City
United States Coast Guard enlisted
Wagner Seahawks baseball coaches
United States Coast Guard personnel of World War II